Obecnice is a municipality and village in Příbram District in the Central Bohemian Region of the Czech Republic. It has about 1,200 inhabitants.

Administrative parts
Village of Oseč is an administrative part of Obecnice.

References

Villages in Příbram District